Luke Adam Singh (born 12 September 2000) is a professional football player who plays as a defender for Atlético Ottawa in the Canadian Premier League on loan from Toronto FC in Major League Soccer. Born in Canada, he represents Trinidad and Tobago internationally.

Early life
Singh played youth soccer with North Mississauga SC and the Brampton Youth SC. He also spent some time with the Team Ontario Provincial program. He later moved on to the Toronto FC Academy.

Club career
After spending time in the Toronto FC Academy, he began playing for Toronto FC III in the semi-professional League1 Ontario in 2018. He scored his first goal on August 26 against North Mississauga SC. He went on trial with Danish club Brøndby at the beginning of 2019. He returned to Toronto at the end of January, after suffering an injury.

In March 2019, he signed a professional contract with Toronto FC II of USL League One. He immediately joined Brøndby IF in the Danish Superliga on loan, with whom he had trained earlier in the year until the end of 2019. He did not make any appearances with the first team, playing primarily with the Reserve team, with whom he scored two goals in 24 appearances, and the U19 team.

After Toronto FC II withdrew from the 2020 USL League One season due to the COVID-19 pandemic, Singh spent a large part of the season training with the first team. In April 2021, he signed a short-term non-MLS loan deal ahead of the club's CONCACAF Champions League match against Mexican side León, making his debut as a late game substitute in that match. He signed a second four-day deal on April 13, ahead of the second leg tie against León, making his first start in a 2–1 victory over the Mexican side. He signed an official first team deal on April 16. Singh scored his first goal for TFC on April 24 against Vancouver Whitecaps FC. He was loaned to the second team for some matches in 2021.

In February 2022, Singh was set to join Canadian Premier League side Pacific FC on loan as part of Toronto FC's transfer deal for Lukas MacNaughton, however, the loan ultimately did not proceed following further discussions between the clubs. Instead, the next month on March 3 Toronto announced Singh had joined FC Edmonton on loan for the 2022 CPL season. He made his debut for Edmonton on April 10, in the season-opener against Valour FC.

In March 2023, Singh was sent on a full season loan to Atlético Ottawa in the Canadian Premier League.

International career
Singh is eligible to represent Canada, where he was born, and also Trinidad and Tobago, where both of his parents were born.

He attended the Canadian U15 Identification camp in 2014 and 2015.

He first represented the Trinidad and Tobago U17 team in the 2017 CONCACAF U-17 Championship qualifying tournament, playing two matches. He later represented the Trinidad and Tobago U20 team at the 2018 CONCACAF U-20 Championship.

Singh received his first senior call up to Trinidad and Tobago on May 28, 2021 for their World Cup qualifying matches, but three days later also accepted an invitation to join the Canada's training camp ahead of the same qualifiers. He was to join the Trinidad national team following the Canadian camp, but on June 7, it was reported that Singh would no longer be joining the Trinidad and Tobago camp after the Soca Warriors were eliminated from World Cup qualification. Instead he attended the camp for the Canadian national team.

Career statistics

Club

References

External links
Toronto FC profile
USSDA profile
Canada Soccer profile

2000 births
Living people
Citizens of Trinidad and Tobago through descent
Trinidad and Tobago footballers
Trinidad and Tobago youth international footballers
Canadian soccer players
Canadian sportspeople of Trinidad and Tobago descent
Canadian sportspeople of Indian descent
Trinidad and Tobago people of Indian descent
Association football defenders
Soccer players from Brampton
Homegrown Players (MLS)
North Mississauga SC players
Vaughan Azzurri players
Toronto FC players
Toronto FC II players
FC Edmonton players
Atlético Ottawa players
USL League One players
Major League Soccer players
Canadian Premier League players
Canadian expatriate soccer players
Trinidad and Tobago expatriate footballers
Expatriate men's footballers in Denmark
Canadian expatriate sportspeople in Denmark
Trinidad and Tobago expatriate sportspeople in Denmark